Don Giovanni is a 1979 French-Italian film directed by Joseph Losey. It is an adaptation of Mozart's classic 1787 opera Don Giovanni, based on the Don Juan legend of a seducer, destroyed by his excesses. The opera itself has been called one of Mozart's "trio of masterpieces". The film stars Ruggero Raimondi in the title role, and the conductor is Lorin Maazel. Nearly three decades after the film's release, Nicholas Wapshott called it a "near perfect amalgamation of opera and the screen".

Plot 

After an unsuccessful attempt to seduce Donna Anna (soprano Edda Moser), Don Giovanni (baritone Ruggero Raimondi) kills her father Il Commendatore (bass John Macurdy). The next morning, Giovanni meets Donna Elvira (soprano Kiri Te Kanawa), a woman he previously seduced and abandoned. Later, Giovanni happens upon the preparations for a peasant wedding and tries to seduce the bride-to-be Zerlina (mezzo-soprano Teresa Berganza), but his ambition is frustrated by Donna Elvira.

Donna Anna soon realizes that Giovanni killed her father, and she pursues the seducer along with her fiance Don Ottavio (tenor Kenneth Riegel). Ever ready to attempt a seduction, Giovanni woos Elvira's maid. As part of his plans, he switches clothes with his servant Leporello (bass-baritone José van Dam), who rapidly finds himself in trouble with people who mistake him for his master. Leporello flees and eventually meets Giovanni at the cemetery where Il Commendatore is buried. They jokingly invite the statue at his grave to dinner. While they are dining, the supernaturally animated statue arrives, and the horrified Giovanni is drawn into an open-pit fire.

Production 
In the opera, the action supposedly takes place in Spain, but Mozart's librettist Lorenzo Da Ponte wrote in Italian, and this film uses locations in  Venice and Murano.  In particular, the film features buildings by Palladio in and around the city of Vicenza (Basilica Palladiana, Villa Rotonda and Teatro Olimpico). The singers recorded their performances separately, and lip-synched in their film performances. As Noel Megahey notes, ""dragging the orchestra of the Opéra de Paris around the locations for the length of the production for a live recording is completely unfeasible".

The total budget for the film was about $7,000,000.

Reception 
The film is not a recording of a stage performance but "an original interpretation of the opera on film". Using the original libretto and music, it was directed as a musical film with a series of scenes, each using multiple cameras and takes. Four years earlier, Losey had directed a film version of Bertolt Brecht's play Galileo using a similar approach; Reginald Beck had also edited the earlier film, along with many others directed by Losey. The cinematography is lush with many scenes set in visually appealing locations, such as the Villa Rotonda or gondolas gliding through the canals of Venice.

Following the 1979 theatrical release of the film, Vincent Canby complimented the singing but concluded that the filming "didn't work". He found the filmed closeups of the singers to be mostly jarring and ineffective. On the other hand, Judith Martin considered it successful. In 2007, Nicholas Wapshott wrote that "One near perfect amalgamation of opera and the screen is Joseph Losey's Don Giovanni".

Reginald Beck won the 1980 César Award for Best Editing, and Alexandre Trauner won for Production Design.

Home media
A Blu-ray and a region 1 DVD were released by Olive Films in 2013.

References

Further reading

 The review is undated, but was done after the DVD release. It was archived for the first time in 2003.

External links 
 

Films based on Don Giovanni
1979 films
1970s musical films
French musical films
Italian musical films
British musical films
West German films
Films directed by Joseph Losey
Films set in Venice
Films set in the 18th century
Opera films
1970s Italian-language films
Films produced by Michel Seydoux
German musical films
1970s British films
1970s Italian films
1970s French films
1970s German films